The Longwood Hotel (also known as the St. George Hotel or Orange and Black or Longwood Village Inn) is a historic building in Longwood, Florida. It was located on Old Dixie Highway but is now located at 300 North Ronald Reagan Boulevard. It was added to the U.S. National Register of Historic Places on May 10, 1984. The Longwood Hotel was built in 1885.

References

External links
 Seminole County listings at National Register of Historic Places
 Florida's Office of Cultural and Historical Programs
 Seminole County listings
 Famous Floridians of Longwood

National Register of Historic Places in Seminole County, Florida
Hotel buildings completed in 1885
Hotels in Greater Orlando
1885 establishments in Florida
Longwood, Florida